Ihakara Porutu "Kara" Puketapu is a leader of the Te Āti Awa iwi in Waiwhetū, Lower Hutt, New Zealand. .

Kara was born to Īhāia Pōrutu (Paddy) Puketapu of the Te Āti Awa iwi and Taranaki-born Vera May Yeates (1904 – 16 March 1991), a Pākehā, who were both on their second marriages.

Puketapu grew up in Taranaki and rose through the ranks of the Ministry of Maori Affairs (later named the Ministry of Māori Affairs and ultimately Te Puni Kōkiri) to become Secretary of Maori Affairs. He is renowned for forging a new direction for the Department to empower Māori development in response to the difficulties being faced by Māori in the urban environment. Under his leadership, several Kōkiri units were established in the Wellington area. These units worked with local communities to devise programmes to support cultural and economic aspirations, thus reversing the normal 'top down' approach of government departments. It was at one of these Kōkiri units in Wainuiomata that the first kōhanga reo was established. Puketapu's philosophy is outlined in his book Reform from Within.

During his time as Secretary of Māori Affairs, Puketapu chaired the  management committee of Te Maori, the first international exhibition of Māori objects as art. After a triumphant run at the Metropolitan Museum of Art, Saint Louis Art Museum and the M.H. de Young Memorial Museum, Te Maori toured New Zealand.

Puketapu also rose in standing within his iwi, to become chairperson of the Te Āti Awa Runanga (tribal council). The Te Āti Awa Runanga run a primary health organisation in their Waiwhetū area and a radio station (Atiawa Toa FM). Recently they have clashed with local authorities over the custodianship of waka.

Puketapu was top rugby  player in his youth, and later became involved in coaching Rugby League. Puketapu became involved with the Wainuiomata Lions both as a coach and serving as President. During the 1995 Lion Red Cup Puketapu briefly served as the coach of the Hutt Valley Hawks.

In 2008, Puketapu resigned from the Port Nicholson Block Treaty Settlement Trust  chaired by Sir Ngatata Love over the compensation for Waiwhetū land confiscated by the Crown in the 1940s.

References

Living people
Te Āti Awa people
New Zealand rugby league coaches
New Zealand rugby league administrators
New Zealand Māori public servants
Year of birth missing (living people)